Estadio Olimpico Benito Juarez is a multi-purpose stadium in Ciudad Juárez, Mexico, located just across the Rio Grande from El Paso, Texas.  It is currently used mostly for football matches and concerts and is the home stadium of  FC Juárez of the Liga MX. On May 12, 1981, the stadium was opened with a scoreless draw between the Mexico national football team and Atlético Madrid.  The stadium is part of the campus of the  Universidad Autónoma de Ciudad Juárez and holds 19,703 people.

See also

References

External links
Stadium picture

Olimpico Benito Juarez
Multi-purpose stadiums
Sports venues in Chihuahua (state)
College association football venues in Mexico
Athletics (track and field) venues in Mexico
1981 establishments in Mexico
Sports venues completed in 1981